The Fisher Hill Historic District encompasses a residential area in central Brookline, Massachusetts.  The area was subdivided and built out beginning in the 1880s, with landscaping design by Frederick Law Olmsted and John Charles Olmsted.    The district is bounded on the west by Chestnut Hill Avenue, Baxter Road, and Channing Road, and on the south by Massachusetts Route 9.   Its eastern boundary runs along Buckminster Street to Dean Road, joining the northern boundary of Clinton Road, running between Dean Road and Chestnut Hill Avenue.  Prior to its development in the 1880s, Fisher Hill had a relatively small number of landowners.  Some of them banded together, hiring the Olmsteds to design a subdivision plan for the entire district.  Lots were sold to wealthy individuals, who built fashionable houses, often designed by architects.  In 1914 a restrictive covenant was entered into by a significant number of property owners, restricting their properties to strictly single-family residential uses.

The district was listed on the National Register of Historic Places in 1985.

See also
National Register of Historic Places listings in Brookline, Massachusetts

References

Historic districts in Norfolk County, Massachusetts
Brookline, Massachusetts
National Register of Historic Places in Brookline, Massachusetts
Historic districts on the National Register of Historic Places in Massachusetts